Northbrook/Glenview School District 30 is a school district with schools located in Northbrook, Illinois and Glenview, Illinois, suburbs of Chicago. Students from this district converge to either Glenbrook North High School or Glenbrook South High School. Students from Wescott usually later attend GBN while students from Willowbrook usually later attend GBS.

Schools
Wescott Elementary School (Grades: K-5) (Located in Northbrook)
Willowbrook Elementary School (Grades: PK-5)(Located in Glenview)
Maple Middle School (Grades: 6-8) (Located in Northbrook)

History
Northbrook/Glenview School District 30 was initially formulated around 1860.

Maple School was completely rebuilt from 2018-2019.

Both Wescott and Willowbrook Schools were remodeled in the Summer of 2021.

External links
 Northbrook/Glenview School District 30

Northbrook, Illinois
School districts in Cook County, Illinois